Patelguda is a village in Sanga Reddy district in Telangana, India. It falls under Ameenpur mandal.

References

Villages in Ranga Reddy district